The 2021–22 season is Gillingham's 129th year in their history and ninth consecutive season in League One. Along with the league, the club will also compete in the FA Cup, the EFL Cup and the 2021–22 EFL Trophy. The season covers the period from 1 July 2021 to 30 June 2022.

Pre-season friendlies
As part of their pre-season preparations, Gillingham announced friendly matches against Chatham Town, Welling United, Dartford, Queens Park Rangers, Ebbsfleet United, Peterborough United, Colchester United, Millwall, Leyton Orient and Norwich City.

However, the scheduled friendlies against Dartford, Queens Park Rangers, Peterborough United and Ebbsfleet United was cancelled due to a number of players being tested positive for COVID-19.

Competitions

League One

League table

Results summary

Matches
Gills' fixtures were announced on 24 June 2021.

FA Cup

Gillingham were drawn at home to Cheltenham Town in the first round.

EFL Cup

Gills were drawn at away to Crawley Town in the first round and at home to Cheltenham Town in the second round.

EFL Trophy

The Gills were drawn into Group A of the Southern section, alongside Colchester United, Ipswich Town and West Ham United U21s. On July 7, the fixtures for the group stage round was confirmed.

Transfers

Transfers in

Loans in

Loans out

Transfers out

References

Gillingham
Gillingham F.C. seasons